Cape Yakataga is a community in the City and Borough of Yakutat of the U.S. state of Alaska.

Yakataga is a Native American name meaning "canoe road", a reference to two reefs which form a canoe passage to the village. A United States Post Office was established at Cape Yakataga in 1935.

Cape Yakataga is served by the Yakataga Airport, which until 2012 had scheduled passenger service subsidized by the U.S. Essential Air Service program.  Air service was withdrawn when, in consultation with the United States Department of Labor and examination of State of Alaska Permanent Fund Division records, it was determined that the location no longer had permanent residents.

Demographics

Yakataga appeared once on the 1960 U.S. Census as an unincorporated village. It is now located within the City and Borough of Yakutat.

References

Yakutat City and Borough, Alaska
Unincorporated communities in Alaska